Jhoan Viafara (born January 12, 1990) is a Colombian footballer who plays for Tondela .

References

1990 births
Living people
Colombian footballers
C.D. Tondela players
Colombian expatriate footballers
Expatriate footballers in Portugal
Association football forwards
Colombian expatriate sportspeople in Portugal